This is a list of feature films produced by the Fox Film Corporation, including those films produced by its corporate predecessor, the Box Office Attractions Company. Some of the later films in this list were produced by Fox Film, but were released and distributed by 20th Century Fox after the 1935 merger with Twentieth Century Pictures.

Box Office Attractions Company

Fox Film Corporation

1910s

1920s

1930s

Merger in 1935 
Fox Film Corporation combined with 20th Century Pictures in May 1935 to form their fusion 20th Century-Fox Film Corporation.

Bibliography

External links 

Lists of films by studio
American films by studio
Disney-related lists